Raphael Ragucci (born 4 June 1984), known professionally as RAF Camora, is an Austrian rapper.

Biography
Raphael Ragucci was born in Vevey, Switzerland, to an Austrian father from Voralberg and an Italian mother from Naples. Ragucci settled in Vienna, Austria in 1997 and grew up in Rudolfsheim-Fünfhaus.

Known initially as RAF Camora, he founded a hip hop crew with the Polish Rapatoi. At 17, he was in the French Connection crew and soon later in French-speaking Assaut Mystik. He founded with rapper Joshi Mizu the band Balkan Express. Family Bizz was a debut joint album with both Assaut Mystik and Balkan Express. In 2006, he released his EP Skandal with Emirez. In 2009 he released his studio album Nächster Stopp Zukunft as RAF Camora.

In January 2010, he took the stage name RAF 3.0 shelving his earlier name and signed with Vienna-based Irievibrations Records with whom he released the self-titled album RAF 3.0 in 2012 and Hoch 2 in 2013. Both were huge successes on the German, Austrian and Swiss charts.

Reverting to his original name RAF Camora, in 2013 he founded his own record label Indipendenza. His albums Ghøst in 2016 and Anthrazit in 2017 were big successes on German, Austrian and Swiss charts. Ragucci announced his fourth studio album Ghøst in January 2016. The album was released on 15 April 2016 and debuted in the top-20 of German speaking Europe.

Ragucci released a new album, Zenit on 1 November 2019. It has peaked at spot number one for two weeks on Ö3 Austria and Schweizer Hitparade, and for one week on Offizielle Top 100.

Discography

 Nächster Stopp Zukunft (2009)
 RAF 3.0 (2012)
 Hoch 2 (2013)
 Ghøst (2016)
 Anthrazit (2017)
 Zenit (2019)
 Zukunft (2021)

Awards and nominations

Results

References

External links

1984 births
Living people
Musicians from Vienna
People from Vevey
Austrian rappers
Swiss rappers
Austrian people of Italian descent
Swiss people of Austrian descent
Swiss people of Italian descent